The 2017–18 2. Bundesliga was the 44th season of the 2. Bundesliga, the second highest German football league. It began on 28 July 2017 and concluded on 13 May 2018 with the match between VfL Bochum and FC St. Pauli (0:1) and ended with the 34th match day on 13 May 2018. From 19 December 2017 to 23 January 2018, the season was interrupted by a winter break.

The fixtures were announced on 29 June 2017.

Fortuna Düsseldorf secured the direct promotion to the Bundesliga after 32 days of play, the 1. FC Nürnberg one match day later; 1. FC Nürnberg set a new record with its eighth Bundesliga promotion. The championship was decided on the last match day in a direct duel between the two upstarts, which Fortuna Düsseldorf won. Holstein Kiel was able to reach the autumn championship as a starter and placed third one match day before the end, but lost in the relegation games to VfL Wolfsburg.
In the relegation battle, after 32 days of play, the first decision was made relatively late with the relegation of 1. FC Kaiserslautern. Until the end, six clubs were at risk of relegation, in the end Eintracht Braunschweig, who was still a participant in the promotion delegation last year, had to be relegated to the 3rd division. The FC Erzgebirge Aue had to go into the relegation against Karlsruher SC and was able to secure the class stay there.

Teams

Team changes

Stadiums and locations

Personnel and kits

1. On the sleeves.

Managerial changes

League table

Results

Promotion play-offs

Relegation play-offs
All times are UTC+2.

First leg

Second leg

Erzgebirge Aue won 3–1 on aggregate and therefore both clubs remain in their respective leagues.

Statistics

Top goalscorers

Clean sheets

Number of teams by state

Highs of the season
 The highest wins were all with 5 goals difference:
 The 6:1 between 1. FC Nürnberg at MSV Duisburg on the 6th matchday
 The 5:0 between 1. FC Union Berlin against 1. FC Kaiserslautern on the 8th matchday
 The 5:0 of Arminia Bielefeld against FC St. Pauli on the 16th matchday
 The 5:0 of Holstein Kiel against MSV Duisburg on the 25th matchday
 The games with the most goals scored was with 8 goals:
 The 3:5 of 1. FC Heidenheim against Holstein Kiel on the 10th matchday
 The 6:2 between Holstein Kiel against Eintracht Braunschweig on the 34th matchday
 The highest goal undecided games were:
 The 3:3 between SV Darmstadt 98 against Dynamo Dresden on the 8th matchday
 The 3:3 of 1. FC Union Berlin against the SV Darmstadt 98 on the 15th matchday
 The 3:3 of MSV Duisburg against 1. FC Heidenheim on the 20th marchday
 The highest goal scoring match day was 36 goals on the 27th matchday from 16. To 19. March 2018.

References

External links

2017–18 in German football leagues
2017-18
Germ